Amanda Leighton (born ) is an American actress. She is known for her voice acting as Blossom in the 2016 Cartoon Network animated series The Powerpuff Girls, Poppy in the 2018 Netflix animated series Trolls: The Beat Goes On!, and Polly Plantar in the 2019 Disney Channel animated series Amphibia. She is also known for her recurring role as Emma in the Freeform drama series The Fosters.

Personal life
Leighton grew up in Fresno, California and she graduated from Clovis West High School.

Leighton married professional mixed martial artist Sage Northcutt on December 5, 2020.

Career
Leighton started her acting career at the age of 10 in her home town, and got her first agent at the age of 12 when she started taking acting classes and going to auditions in Los Angeles. She also has 11 years of dance experience, which she used in ABC Family's Make It or Break It, where she played a gymnast named Wendy Capshaw. In June 2015, Leighton was cast to voice Blossom in Cartoon Networks revival of The Powerpuff Girls, which ran from 2016 to 2019.

Leighton's other appearances include roles on several television shows including Pretty Little Liars as Danielle, Grey's Anatomy as patient Sarah Cassidy with Treacher Collins syndrome, 90210 as Alex Scarborough, Criminal Minds as Trish Leake, and as a singing Cactus Kid in Six Feet Under. She recurred as Emma on the ABC Family/Freeform drama series The Fosters from 2014 to 2018. From 2017 to 2022, she recurred as young Sophie on the NBC television drama series This Is Us. Leighton voiced the regular roles of Poppy in the animated series Trolls: The Beat Goes On! which was released by Netflix between 2018 and 2019, and the pollywog Polly Plantar in the Disney Channel animated series Amphibia, which aired from 2019 to 2022. She costarred in the 2020 drama film Chance.

Filmography

References

External links 

 
 

Living people
21st-century American actresses
Actresses from Fresno, California
American child actresses
American film actresses
American soap opera actresses
American television actresses
American video game actresses
American voice actresses
Year of birth missing (living people)